Kanchipuram railway station serves as the principal railway station of the temple city of Kanchipuram in Tamil Nadu. The station is a part of the Chennai railway division of the Southern Railway zone, one of the eight zones of the Indian Railways and is coded as CJ for official purposes. The station code can be retraced to a time as early as the 1860s when a 3 ft 6in wide gauge line was laid between Arakkonam and Kanchipuram (then known as Conjeevaram – thus CJ) by Indian Tramway Company. Southbound services towards Chengalpattu were then inaugurated, much later in the 1880s, when the Chengalpattu–Walajabad section was commissioned, after which in 1891, Arakkonam–Chengalpattu and Chengalpattu–Arakkonam passenger services began, post conversion of the entire section to broad gauge.

Although, the resident folklore of Kanchipuram are more accustomed to calling this station as "New railway station", the station code CJ has been taken from the old railway station, about 1.5 km away, that is now referred to as "Kanchipuram East" – CJE.

Location and layout

Kanchipuram railway station is located at the entrance to the town on the Western banks of the Ponneri Eri. Situated about 2.6 kilometres from the entry arch of Kanchipuram on the Chennai–Bangalore highway, it is in close proximity to the Kanchi Sri Ekambareswarar Temple and the nearest airport from here is the Chennai International Airport, located at a distance of 72 km from the station.

The station is on the Arakkonam–Chengalpattu branch line which is a major route for local and suburban traffic.

Kanchipuram railway station is one of the stations in the Chennai Suburban Railway on the Chennai Beach–Chengalpattu–Tirumalpur–Arakkonam route (South-West line) now fully electrified and commissioning as a circular route with two circular service as electric multiple unit running in each direction.

External links 

 
 

Chennai railway division
Railway stations in Kanchipuram district
Kanchipuram
Railway stations opened in 2004